Lee Ju-hyeong (born 4 January 1965) is a South Korean athlete. He competed in the men's hammer throw at the 1988 Summer Olympics.

References

1965 births
Living people
Athletes (track and field) at the 1988 Summer Olympics
South Korean male hammer throwers
Olympic athletes of South Korea
Place of birth missing (living people)
20th-century South Korean people